Sherman's Showcase is an American comedy television series created by Bashir Salahuddin and Diallo Riddle. The series premiered on July 31, 2019, on IFC. An hour long "Black History Month Spectacular" aired on June 19, 2020, and that same month a six-episode second season was confirmed, set to air on both IFC and AMC in 2022.

Premise
Sherman's Showcase is inspired by variety shows including Soul Train, American Bandstand, The Midnight Special, and In Living Color with each episode hosted by Sherman McDaniel as he takes viewers through time via music and comedy drawn from the forty-year library of a legendary (but fictitious) musical variety show. To do this, the series uses the plot device of presenting a series of paid programs involving the sale of a mostly-complete 23-disc set of 47 seasons of Sherman's Showcase, which are introduced by various celebrity hosts.

Cast
 Bashir Salahuddin as Sherman McDaniels
 Diallo Riddle as Dutch Shepherd

Cameos
 Common
 Lil Rel Howery
 Tiffany Haddish
 Ray J
 Terrence J
 Damon Wayans Jr.
 Quincy Jones
 Mike Judge
 Ne-Yo
 Marlon Wayans
 Gary Anthony Williams
 Colleen Camp
 Phonte Coleman

Episodes

Season 1 (2019)

Special

Season 2 (2022)

Production

Development
On July 29, 2017, it was announced that IFC had given the production an episodic script order. The series was created by Bashir Salahuddin and Diallo Riddle who were also expected to write and executive produce the potential series.

On May 3, 2018, it was announced that IFC had given the production a series order for a first season consisting of eight episodes. In addition to the previously announced creative team, it was announced that John Legend would serve as an executive producer. Production companies involved with the series include Get Lifted Film Co. and RadicalMedia.

On April 8, 2019, it was announced that the series would premiere on July 31, 2019.

Casting
Alongside the series order announcement, it was confirmed that Bashir Salahuddin would star as the host of the fictional variety series.

Reception
On review aggregation website Rotten Tomatoes, the series holds an approval rating of 100% with an average rating of 8.58/10, based on 21 reviews. The site's critics consensus reads: "Bold, brisk, and beautiful, Sherman's Showcase is a delightful and stylish sketch show that moves to its own groove and invites everyone to laugh along." Metacritic, which uses a weighted average, assigned the series a score of 76 out of 100 based on 10 critics, indicating "generally favorable reviews."

External links

References

2010s American satirical television series
English-language television shows
2019 American television series debuts
IFC (American TV channel) original programming
AMC (TV channel) original programming